Men Only Think of That is a 1976 Argentine film directed by Enrique Cahen Salaberry.

Cast

External links
 

1976 films
Argentine comedy films
1970s Spanish-language films
1970s Argentine films
Films directed by Enrique Cahen Salaberry